Stefan Petrovski (born 2 November 1991) is a Macedonian cyclist. He is a five time Macedonian national road race champion, and also won the national time trial championship in 2015.

Major results

2011
 1st  Road race, National Road Championships
2012
 National Road Championships
1st  Road race
3rd Time trial
2013
 3rd Time trial, National Road Championships
2014
 1st  Road race, National Road Championships
 1st Stage 4 Tour of Kosovo
 Tour of Albania
1st Prologue & Stage 3
2015
 National Road Championships
1st  Road race
1st  Time trial
2017
 1st  Road race, National Road Championships
2019
 National Road Championships
3rd Road race
3rd Time trial

References

External links

1991 births
Living people
Macedonian male cyclists